The 2005 FIBA Americas Championship, later known as the FIBA AmeriCup (also known as The Tournament of the Americas), was hosted by the Dominican Republic, from August 24, to September 4, 2005. The games were played in Santo Domingo. This FIBA AmeriCup was to earn the four berths allocated to the Americas for the 2006 FIBA World Championship, in Japan. Argentina had already qualified, by winning the gold medal at the 2004 Olympics. Brazil won the tournament, the country's third AmeriCup championship.

Venues 
All games were played at the Palacio de los Deportes Virgilio Travieso Soto.

Qualification 
Eight teams qualified during the qualification tournaments held in their respective zones in 2004; two teams (USA and Canada) qualified automatically since they are the only members of the North America zone.
 North America: , 
 Caribbean and Central America:, 

The tournament draw took place Monday, April 18, in Santo Domingo. The teams were split into 5 pots; those drawn first went to Group A, those drawn last went to Group B.

The draw split the tournament into two groups:

Group A

Group B

Format 
 The top four teams from each group advance to the quarterfinals.
 Results and standings among teams within the same group are carried over.
 The top four teams at the quarterfinals advance to the semifinals (1 vs. 4, 2 vs. 3).
 The winners in the knockout semifinals advance to the Final, where both are guaranteed of berths in the 2006 FIBA World Championship. The losers figure in a third-place playoff. The semifinal losers were also given berths in the 2006 World Championship. Also, should Argentina reach one of the first four places in the tournament, due to their obtaining the gold medal in the 2004 Olympic Tournament in Athens, the fifth best team in the quarterfinals stage was also qualified for the 2006 World Championship.

Tie-breaking criteria 
Ties are broken via the following the criteria, with the first option used first, all the way down to the last option:
 Head to head results
 Goal average (not the goal difference) between the tied teams
 Goal average of the tied teams for all teams in its group

Squads

Preliminary round 

Times given below are in Atlantic Standard Time (UTC-4).

Group A 

|}

Group B 

|}

Quarterfinal group 

The top four teams in both Group A and Group B advanced to the quarterfinal group. Then each team played the four from the other group once to complete a full round robin. Records from the preliminary groups carried over, but only against teams that also advanced. The top four teams advanced to the semifinals. The fifth-place team (Panama) did not continue competing for the Americas Championship, but qualified for the 2006 FIBA World Championship.

|}

Knockout stage

Semifinals

Third place game

Final

Awards

Statistical leaders

Individual Tournament Highs 

Points

Rebounds

Assists

Steals

Blocks

Minutes

Individual Game Highs

Team Tournament Highs 

Offensive PPG

Defensive PPG

Rebounds

Assists

Steals

Blocks

Team Game highs

Final standings

References

External links 
 https://web.archive.org/web/20070212115741/http://www.fibaamerica.com/torneos1_us.asp?t=XGLQKBLQOI
 https://web.archive.org/web/20060810180943/http://www.usabasketball.com/men/2005/05_mtoa_results.html

 
FIBA AmeriCup
2005–06 in North American basketball
2005–06 in South American basketball
2005 in Dominican Republic sport
International basketball competitions hosted by the Dominican Republic